Iveta Poloková (born 17 August 1970) is a Czech gymnast. She competed at the 1988 Summer Olympics and the 1992 Summer Olympics.

References

External links
 

1970 births
Living people
Czech female artistic gymnasts
Olympic gymnasts of Czechoslovakia
Gymnasts at the 1988 Summer Olympics
Gymnasts at the 1992 Summer Olympics
People from Frýdek-Místek
Sportspeople from the Moravian-Silesian Region